Krasovka is a rural locality (a village) in Listopadovskoye Rural Settlement, Gribanovsky District, Voronezh Oblast, Russia. The population was 148 in 2010.

Geography 
Krasovka is located 38 km west of Gribanovsky (the district's administrative centre) by road. Polyana is the nearest rural locality.

References 

Rural localities in Gribanovsky District